191 Kolga (minor planet designation: 191 Kolga) is a large, dark main-belt asteroid that was discovered by German-American astronomer C. H. F. Peters on September 30, 1878, in Clinton, New York. It is named after Kólga, the daughter of Ægir in Norse mythology.

In 2009, Photometric observations of this asteroid were made at the Palmer Divide Observatory in Colorado Springs, Colorado. The resulting light curve shows a synodic rotation period of 17.625 ± 0.004 hours with a brightness variation of 0.30 ± 0.03 in magnitude. Previous independent studies produced inconsistent results that differ from this finding.

References

External links 
 Lightcurve plot of 191 Kolga, Palmer Divide Observatory, B. D. Warner (2009)
 Asteroid Lightcurve Database (LCDB), query form (info )
 Dictionary of Minor Planet Names, Google books
 Asteroids and comets rotation curves, CdR – Observatoire de Genève, Raoul Behrend
 Discovery Circumstances: Numbered Minor Planets (1)-(5000) – Minor Planet Center
 
 

Background asteroids
Kolga
Kolga
XC:-type asteroids (Tholen)
Cb-type asteroids (SMASS)
18780930